The following highways are numbered 79:

Australia
 Calder Highway
 Silver City Highway
 (South Australia)

India
 National Highway 79 (India)

Iran 
Road 79

Israel
Highway 79 (Israel)

Korea, South
 National Route 79
Gukjido 79

New Zealand
 New Zealand State Highway 79

Philippines
 N79 highway (Philippines)

United States
 Interstate 79
 U.S. Route 79
 Alabama State Route 79
 Arizona State Route 79
 Arkansas Highway 79 (1926) (former)
 California State Route 79
 Colorado State Highway 79
 Connecticut Route 79
 Florida State Road 79
 Georgia State Route 79
 Idaho State Highway 79
 Illinois Route 79 (former)
 Indiana State Road 79 (former)
 Iowa Highway 79 (former)
 K-79 (Kansas highway)
 Kentucky Route 79
 Maryland Route 79
 Massachusetts Route 79
 M-79 (Michigan highway)
 Minnesota State Highway 79
 County Road 79 (Scott County, Minnesota)
 Missouri Route 79
 Nebraska Highway 79
 Nebraska Link 79E
 Nebraska Spur 79H
 Nevada State Route 79 (former)
 New Jersey Route 79
 County Route 79 (Bergen County, New Jersey)
 County Route 79 (Ocean County, New Jersey)
 New York State Route 79
 County Route 79 (Chautauqua County, New York)
 County Route 79 (Dutchess County, New York)
 County Route 79 (Herkimer County, New York)
 County Route 79 (Madison County, New York)
 County Route 79 (Montgomery County, New York)
 County Route 79 (Rensselaer County, New York)
 County Route 79 (Suffolk County, New York)
 County Route 79A (Suffolk County, New York)
 County Route 79 (Warren County, New York)
 North Carolina Highway 79
 Ohio State Route 79
 Oklahoma State Highway 79
 Pennsylvania Route 79
 South Carolina Highway 79
 South Dakota Highway 79
 Tennessee State Route 79
 Texas State Highway 79
 Texas State Highway Loop 79
 Farm to Market Road 79
 Utah State Route 79
 Virginia State Route 79
 West Virginia Route 79 (1920s) (former)
 Wisconsin Highway 79

Territories
 U.S. Virgin Islands Highway 79

See also
A79